The Onufri Iconographic Museum is an Albanian national museum dedicated to Byzantine art and iconography in Berat, Albania. The museum is located inside the Church of the Dormition of St Mary in the castle quarter Berat. The museum was named to honor Onufri, a painting Headmaster of the 16th century.

The museum features on display 173 objects chosen among 1500 objects belonging to the found of Albanian Churches and Monasteries as well as to Berat.

History

Collection
The collection of the museum consists of 176 objects, 106 of which are icons and 67 are liturgical objects, and belong to the iconographic Albanian painters who created in the 14th - 20th centuries:
Onufri
Nikola (Onufri’s son)
Onouphrios Cypriotes
David Selenica
Kostandin Shpataraku
Çetiri’s (or Katro) tribe (Gjergj, Nikolla, Johani, Naumi, Gjergji junior)
Many other anonymous painters.

Gallery

References

External links
National Museum "Onufri", Muzeumet Berat

Museums in Albania
Eastern Orthodox icons
Tourist attractions in Berat
Museums in Berat